The 1958–59 Romanian Hockey League season was the 29th season of the Romanian Hockey League. Six teams participated in the league, and CCA Bucuresti won the championship.

Regular season

External links
hochei.net

Rom
Romanian Hockey League seasons
1958–59 in Romanian ice hockey